

Safi Pirak 
Safi Pirak is a village in Sibi district, Balochistan, Pakistan.

References

See also
 Mehergarh
 Bibi Nani
 khajjak
 Dehpal
 Marghazani
 Kurak

Balochistan
Sibi District